Not So Silent Night ... Christmas with REO Speedwagon is the sixteenth and most recent to date, studio album by REO Speedwagon. It was released on November 3, 2009 by Sony Music, two years after the band's previous studio album, Find Your Own Way Home.

On July 1, 2010, the album was re-released with three bonus tracks, and a DVD was released in a series from Sony Music called The Yule Log DVD, in which the music from "Not So Silent Night ... Christmas with REO Speedwagon" is featured with three different holiday visuals (one of them the yule log of the series' title). The original CD cover is featured on the DVD menu.

Track listing

Personnel 

REO Speedwagon 
 Kevin Cronin – acoustic guitar, lead vocals (1-11, 13-16), backing vocals, arrangements (1-8, 10, 13, 15), vocal arrangements 
 Dave Amato – lead guitars, backing vocals
 Neal Doughty – keyboards
 Bruce Hall – bass, backing vocals, lead vocals (12)
 Bryan Hitt – drums, percussion 

Additional performers
 Joe Vannelli – keyboards, orchestrations, arrangements (1-8, 10, 13, 15), vocal arrangements 
 Dave Pearlman – pedal steel guitar (12)
 Mark Goldenberg – acoustic guitar (16)
 Perri (Carol Perry, Darlene Perry, Lori Perry and Sharon Perry) – backing vocals 
 Holly Cronin – backing vocals (16)

Production 
 Joe Vannelli – producer, engineer, mixing 
 Kevin Cronin – associate producer 
 Jeremy Duche – assistant engineer 
 Meat and Potatoes, Inc. – art direction, design

Release history

References

REO Speedwagon albums
2009 Christmas albums
Sony Music Christmas albums
Christmas albums by American artists
Pop rock Christmas albums